Angophora melanoxylon, commonly known as Coolabah apple, is a species of small to medium-sized tree that is endemic to eastern Australia. It has rough, fibrous bark on the trunk and branches, linear to narrow lance-shaped adult leaves, flower buds in groups of three or seven, white or creamy white flowers and cup-shaped, cylindrical or barrel-shaped fruit.

Description
It has rough, fibrous, greyish bark on the trunk and branches.

Taxonomy and naming
Angophora melanoxylon was first formally described in 1900 by Richard Thomas Baker in the Proceedings of the Linnean Society of New South Wales.

Distribution and habitat
Coolabah apple grows in deep, sandy soils and occurs sporadically in dry areas between Pilliga Coolabah and Bourke in New South Wales and Cunnamulla, Augathella and St George in Queensland.

Conservation status
This eucalypt is classified as of "least concern" in Queensland under the Queensland Government Nature Conservation Act 1992.

References

melanoxylon
Flora of New South Wales
Flora of Queensland
Trees of Australia
Plants described in 1900
Taxa named by Richard Thomas Baker